The FRIENDS Programs are a series of Resilience programs developed by Professor Paula Barrett. The programs aim to increase social and emotional skills, promote resilience, and preventing anxiety and depression across the lifespan. As a prevention protocol, FRIENDS has been noted as “one of the most robustly-supported programmes for internalising disorders,” with “a number of large-scale type 1 randomised control trials worldwide” demonstrating its effectiveness. The FRIENDS programs are acknowledged by the World Health Organization as effective evidence based prevention programs.

The FRIENDS programs incorporate physiological, cognitive and behavioural strategies to assist children, youths and adults in coping with stress and worry. Studies have demonstrated the effectiveness of FRIENDS in addressing mental health issues such as  OCD, anxiety, depression, autism and stress in children, adolescents, adults and the elderly. Furthermore, studies have also shown that protective factors such as self-esteem, self-concept, coping skills, hope and social support are enhanced in the program. The FRIENDS protocol was designed to be delivered in both clinical and educational settings by teachers, psychologists, and allied health professionals. The FRIENDS Programs continue to be researched and developed by author, Professor Paula Barrett, in Queensland, Australia, as well as a host of researchers worldwide including Professor Paul Stallard, Professor Elisabeth Utens, and Professor Bente Storm Haugland amongst others.

History 
The FRIENDS Programs were developed by Professor Paula Barrett. Based in cognitive behavioral techniques, the gold standard for treating and preventing anxiety and depression, the protocol was originally developed for the early intervention and prevention of anxiety. Unlike other anxiety protocols at the time, such as Phillip C. Kendall's Coping Cat, FRIENDS utilises a group format and can be used in a prevention, early intervention or a treatment approach.

In 1999 another round of research was performed which led to the production of a third edition of FRIENDS for Children, which incorporated the research feedback to tailor the program to being more teacher-friendly. Further research and development from 2000 onward caused iterative improvements toward the FRIENDS Programs to make them what they are today.

In response to the devastating Queensland Floods of 2010/2011, Professor Paula Barrett developed the Adult Resilience for Life Program. This Program was designed to help adults cope with loss and extreme stress that was prevalent after natural disasters. The Adult Resilience Program was also rolled out to victims of the 2011 Christchurch earthquake in order to help that population cope with the loss of property and loved ones.

The Adult Resilience for Life Program was further developed into the Adult Resilience Strong Not Tough Program in 2012. This Program is run in a two-day format and teaches coping strategies and relaxation techniques to adults and the elderly.

Format 
The FRIENDS protocol has been adapted into four developmentally-sensitive programs:
Fun FRIENDS (4 – 7 years)
FRIENDS for life (8 – 11 years)
My FRIENDS Youth (12 – 15 years)
Adult Resilience for Life (16 years and over)

The programs are typically delivered over 10 session with two booster sessions, typically 60–75 minutes. Delivery is, however, flexible across different settings as long as the sequence, structure and topics are respected. Two information sessions of approximately 90–120 minutes are conducted with caregivers and educators to provide strategies for enhancing resilience at home, reinforcing program strategies, and behaviour management techniques.

Specific Goals
Increasing participant's ability to recognise and regulate one's own emotions, thoughts and behaviours
Building participant's skills in taking the perspective of and empathising with others
Improving competencies of establishing and maintaining healthy and rewarding relationships
Providing strategies for making constructive and respectful choices about personal behaviour and social interactions
Enhancing participant's resilience to not only overcome adversity but also to take advantage of positive future challenges
Developing skills to prevent and treat mental health concerns

Content
The FRIENDS programs draw from interventions based in cognitive behavioural, acceptance and commitment, and positive psychology approaches.  Skills covered in the younger programs are represented in the letters of the acronym FRIENDS, whilst the adult program utilises the acronym LIFE. All of the FRIENDS programs overlap in content; however, they differ in the method of delivering skills with each program using developmentally-appropriate activities. Specifically, whilst younger programs such as Fun FRIENDS and FRIENDS for Life encourage more play-based techniques including puppets, storybooks and coloring activities, the My FRIENDS Youth and Adult Resilience programs utilize role plays, group discussions and written activities.

Overall the content is as follows:
 F= Feelings: This stage of the program focuses on building participants’ skills in recognising and responding to their own feelings as well as the feelings of others. Throughout this stage, there is an emphasis on accepting feelings and choosing positive coping behaviours.
 R= Remember to Relax, Have Quiet time: The second stage of the program involves learning about physiological signs of emotions. By recognising these body clues, participants are better able to manage their feelings when they are of a smaller intensity and easier to regulate. This stage also trains participants in strategies to relax including diaphragmatic breathing, progressive muscle relaxation, massage and relaxation imagery. Adolescent and adult programs also utilise mindfulness strategies in this stage.
 I= I can try my best (Inner Helpful Thoughts): In the third stage, participants are introduced to attention training and the cognitive model. Attention and awareness have recently been identified as key factors in the maintenance of gains from evidence-based programs. Attention training encourages participants to practice awareness in the present moment and focusing on positive things in our environment. Both anxious and depressive symptomology typically involves negative evaluations about oneself, others and the world. Cognitive restructuring encourages participants to identify unhelpful thinking styles and challenge these thoughts to have more helpful thoughts, more pleasant feelings and more proactive behaviour.
 E= Explore solutions and Coping Step Plans: The fourth stage of the program differs heavily between younger and older stages of the programs. Overall this stage focuses on learning coping skills and plans to overcome challenging situations including Coping Step Plans, Problem Solving Plans, Friendship Skills, Building Confidence, Conflict Resolution, Role Models, and Support Teams. Overcoming challenging situations can be a daunting task, Problem Solving Plans and Coping Step Plans help participants choose a course of action through brainstorming solutions, evaluating the potential consequences of their actions, breaking down goals into smaller steps, and reviewing the outcomes of their choices. Coping Step Plans are also utilised for exposure training, to help participants break the cycle of anxiety and avoidance to overcome fears, as well as time management, which is especially useful for adolescents. Friendship skills differ across developmental levels of the program ranging from sharing, helping and listening in younger age groups to navigating cyber friendships in older groups. Role Models and Support Teams are discussed as those who may support, guide or inspire participants during challenging situations. Conflict Resolution teaches skills in differentiating conflict styles (passive, assertive, aggressive) and how to best achieve assertive outcomes.
 N = Now reward yourself: This stage involves teaching participants the importance of self-rewarding. Activities highlight the importance of rewarding ourselves for our efforts rather than the outcomes. Interpersonal rewards are encouraged such as time and activities with family and/or friends as opposed to gifts, food, electronics or monetary rewards.
 D= Do it every day: Skills are most effective when practised every day. This letter of FRIENDS is to encourage participants to continue using the skills after the program is completed.
•	S= Smile! Stay calm, and talk to support teams: The final stage of the program is the relapse prevention phase. Participants develop a more applied knowledge of the program by using skills in conjunction with each other. Identification of future challenges and planning strategies for overcoming these is a key learning outcome. Older programs also incorporate teaching participants about giving back to their community and the effects of healthy/unhealthy living (e.g. exercise, diet, substances, sleep) on brain development and mental health.

Use in prevention 
Studies of FRIENDS effectiveness in prevention of anxiety for 9- to 10-year-old children have been mixed in results.

Translations and International Use 
The FRIENDS program is currently used in the following countries: Australia, New Zealand, Hong Kong, Japan, Canada, Mexico, Peru, Brazil, Portugal, the United Kingdom, the Republic of Ireland, Finland, Norway, the Netherlands and Singapore.

Although originally written in English, the FRIENDS program has since been translated into Russian, Arabic, Finnish, Portuguese, Dutch, Japanese and Spanish.

Author
The Friends program was authored by Professor Paula Barrett who continues to develop and administer the FRIENDS Programs both at her private practice Pathways Health and Research Centre in Brisbane, Australia as well as worldwide. Professor Paula Barrett also continues to oversee the training of FRIENDS facilitators and licensees worldwide.

References

External links
 FRIENDS program website
 Pathways Health and Research Center - Australian and World Wide distribution of the Friends Program

Cognitive behavioral therapy